Theatretrain is a performing arts organisation founded by the teacher/director Kevin Dowsett in 1992. It gives part-time training in drama, dance and singing to children and young people aged between 6 and 18 years of age. Since 1993, it has grown into one of the largest professional performing arts training organisations in the United Kingdom. There are currently over 70 centres across the UK and Ireland.

History
Theatretrain was founded by Kevin Dowsett who spent fourteen years as a head of drama and GCSE examiner in schools in the West Midlands and London. He went on to become the theatre tutor at the ILEA's Curtain Theatre where he created a variety of theatre training programmes and established the respected Curtain Youth Theatre. Later, he taught acting extensively in drama schools including Rose Bruford College, East 15 Acting School, Academy of Live and Recorded Arts and the Italia Conti Academy of Theatre Arts where he was head of acting. He also taught advanced acting process (a course for professional actors) for six years at the City Lit in London.

When his job disappeared in government cutbacks in the early 1990s, Dowsett used his extensive experience of education and theatre to create a new approach for training young people in the performing arts. He realised that much performing arts training was based on an examination system conducted through classes. He wanted to make it more creative and closer to a theatre experience rather than school. He devised a system that allowed each young person to perform live theatre to the highest possible standard and where possible to incorporate their own ideas.

Almost immediately the company began to expand and franchises were established across the country. Each centre is managed by a centre director and a creative team that includes teachers of drama, dance and singing who also have the skills of direction, choreography or musical direction. It was decided early on that prices of classes would be kept at a level affordable by most families. This mixing of backgrounds has had the result in making Theatretrain an eclectic and vibrant company. Qualities that are encouraged include friendliness, imagination, energy, enthusiasm, openness, generosity, commitment and leadership skills. Sound, movement, attitude and storytelling are at the heart of the system, as well as connecting with the audience. There is strong interplay between the three disciplines of the performing arts (act, dance and sing) and skills learnt in one area cross fertilise those in another. Dowsett did this by incorporating the skills of ensemble theatre – in this way Theatretrain is a company rather than just a series of different centres. By coming together annually to perform, friendships are created between pupils and between centres so that they learn from each other. There is a strong sense of camaraderie with the sense of team connecting every teacher, centre director and pupil as they learn to be part of something bigger than themselves.

What made Theatretrain distinctive was the performance opportunity given to each pupil. From the beginning, Dowsett worked with the musical director and composer Robert Hyman and together they created shows that grew in size with each passing year. Always using live music this partnership created shows that integrated all the performing arts into the performance. Since 1993, thousands of young people have appeared the stages of the UK's most famous theatres including The London Palladium, Theatre Royal Drury Lane, the Dominion Theatre, Her Majesty's Theatre and the Royal Albert Hall. Theatretrain has become the UK's major provider of performing arts training that leads to performance.

In 2009, the artistic team created a mammoth project called The Long and Winding Road with 5000 schoolchildren who performed the story of The Beatles at The O2 Arena. The special guest was Bill Bailey. In 2010, another 5,000 young people performed Licence to Thrill, a spectacular spoof of James Bond. The special guest this time was Blue Peter's Andy Akinwolere.

In 2010, at the Royal Albert Hall, 1,000 Theatretrain pupils created the most ambitious performance to date. Voices for a Better World told the story of a tribe who had to go to war to learn the value of peace. On this occasion they were joined by 120 young people from 26 different countries who rehearsed in London for 10 days. This performance was the inaugural performance of the World Children's Theatre Ensemble.

On 14 July 2013, 3,500 pupils and teachers performed a particularly spectacular show, 20@O2, at the O2 Arena in London. This 21st birthday show paid tribute to 20 years of unique large scale performance.

Since 1993, Theatretrain has taken work abroad to festivals and encounters meeting children and young people from all over the world. Theatretrain has twice represented the UK at the World Festival of Children's Theatre, in 1994 and 2007.

Many pupils have gone on to higher education and become professional performers or work in the performing arts industry. Many ex-pupils, including the singer Sam Smith, have gone on to higher education and become professional creatives in the performing arts industry.

Theatretrain has performed in many countries around the world such as in New York, USA, and in 2015 and 2016 Theatretrain students performed in the Disneyland Paris pre-parade.

In September 2017, Theatretrain celebrated its 25th birthday with a special show at The Royal Albert Hall in London titled 25 Years – A Celebration!.

Since 2012, Theatretrain has supported the Theodora Children's Charity who provide Giggle Doctors to children's hospitals, hospices and specialist care centres across the UK. In November 2018, in a one day event, they raised £62,738.92 for the charity.

As the worldwide Coronavirus entered the UK in 2020, the company created within days, on-line offer. This included Zoom classes for most pupils, social media activities including masterclasses and live events. The interconnected nature of the company meant that many local and national projects were created that brought the company together on-line. A highlight was the August 2020 Festival – Theatretrain in Mind. The company moved with the times and made even more prominent, life skills as part of the theatre process.

In July 2022 the company celebrated its 30th Birthday by performing a set at the annual Summer by the River Festival at the Scoop by Tower Bridge.
In September 2023 the company will perform its 100th large scale production at the Royal Albert Hall.
The show is called “We’re Gonna Change the World.” 1200 young performers ask the question what is wrong with the world and what will they do to fix it?

Patrons
Theatretrain has support from several well-known actors.
 Sir Derek Jacobi
 Alfred Molina
 Catherine Tate
 Lucy Davis
 Simon Lipkin

Performances

Notes

External links
 Theatretrain's official website
 Theatretrain's Youtube channel includes clips from recent performances

Performing arts companies
Drama schools
Drama schools in the United Kingdom